The Stausee Rundfahrt-Klingnau is a road bicycle race held annually in Klingnau in the canton of Aargau in Switzerland. Since 2005, it has been organised as a 1.1 event on the UCI Europe Tour, although since 2006 it hasn't been held.

Winners

External links
UCI Profile for the race
Palmares by memoire-du-cyclisme.net 

UCI Europe Tour races
Cycle races in Switzerland
Recurring sporting events established in 1949
1949 establishments in Switzerland
Aargau